W22 may refer to:

Mercedes Benz W22 or Mercedes-Benz 380 (1933), eight cylinder powered automobile introduced at the Berlin Motor Show in 1933
Wanderer W22, upper-middle-class six-cylinder sedan introduced by Auto Union under the Wanderer brand in 1933